GK or Gk may refer to:

Arts and entertainment
 GK Films, a British film production company
 GK Reid, an American fashion stylist and TV star of Bravo's Double Exposure
 Gabriel Knight, a series of adventure games
 Godskitchen, an international superclub and trance music brand

Businesses and organizations
 Gallien-Krueger, an instrument amplifier company
 Gawad Kalinga, an anti-poverty movement based in the Philippines
 Society for Orthodontic Dental Technology, a professional body based in Germany
 Jetstar Japan's IATA designator

Places
 Geilenkirchen, a city in North Rhine-Westphalia, Germany, by vehicle registration code until 1971
 Graham-Kapowsin High School in Pierce County, Washington
 Greater Kailash, New Delhi, India
 Guernsey (FIPS PUB 10-4 territory code)

Sports
 Goalkeeper
 Goalkeeper (association football)
 Goalkeeper (handball)
 Goal keeper (netball)
 Goalkeeper (water polo)
 Vegas Golden Knights of the National Hockey League

Other uses
 Gōdō gaisha, a type of Japanese business organization
 G. K. Chesterton, a Roman Catholic novelist and author
 Glucokinase, an enzyme that facilitates phosphorylation of glucose to glucose-6-phosphate
 GK, the gene encoding Glycerol kinase, a phosphotransferase enzyme